Bayardo Abaunza is a retired Nicaraguan-American soccer player who spent his career with amateur teams in the Los Angeles area and earned three caps with the U.S. national team between 1965 and 1969.

Club career
Abaunza, the older brother of Manuel Abaunza, moved to Los Angeles in the late 1950s.  On May 6, 1960, he scored a goal for the Los Angeles All Stars in an 8-1 defeat at the hands of visiting Munich 1860.  In 1964, he played for the Los Angeles Kickers-Victoria when they won the 1964 National Challenge Cup.  In 1965, he moved to Orange County F.C. of the Continental League.  In 1966, Orange County lost in the final of the 1966 National Challenge Cup.  He played for Orange County through at least 1967.

National team
Abaunza earned three caps with the U.S. national team between 1965 and 1969. His first game with the national team came in a March 17, 1965, World Cup qualification win over Honduras. He played the second game with Honduras, a 1–1 tie four days later. Abaunza did not play again until April 20, 1969. On that day, the U.S. lost 2-0 to Haiti.

References

External links

Year of birth missing (living people)
Living people
Soccer players from California
Los Angeles Kickers players
Nicaraguan men's footballers
Nicaraguan emigrants to the United States
United States men's international soccer players
Association football defenders
American men's soccer players